Vitali Igorevich Kaleshin (born 3 October 1980) is a former Russian footballer.

Career 
On 20 February 2009 FC Rubin Kazan have signed right back/right winger, on loan until December 2009 from FC Moscow.

In December 2009 FC Rubin Kazan bought from FC Moscow's right to Kaleshin. He signed a contract with the club for 2 years.

On 28 May 2013 he signed a one-year contract with FC Krasnodar.

Career statistics

Notes

Personal 
Vitali is a son of the former FC Kuban Krasnodar player Igor Kaleshin and the younger brother of Yevgeni Kaleshin.

References

External links
  Player page on the official FC Moscow website
 

1980 births
Sportspeople from Krasnodar
Living people
Russian footballers
Association football defenders
FC Kuban Krasnodar players
FC Lada-Tolyatti players
FC Moscow players
FC Rubin Kazan players
FC Krasnodar players
Moldovan Super Liga players
Russian Premier League players
Russian expatriate footballers
Expatriate footballers in Moldova
Russian expatriate sportspeople in Moldova